Eric Winstanley (15 November 1944 – 20 May 2021) was an English professional footballer who played as a centre-back in the Football League for Barnsley and Chesterfield.

Early life
Eric Winstanley was born on 15 November 1944 in Barnsley, West Riding of Yorkshire.

Playing career
Winstanley started his career with Barnsley after signing a professional contract in May 1962, where he later became captain. He made 410 league appearances for Barnsley and has been described as a "club legend". He joined Chesterfield in August 1973.

Winstanley made five appearances for the England national under-18 team from 1962 to 1963.

Coaching career
Winstanley spent over 20 years on the coaching staff at Barnsley, but left in June 2001, which ended a 34-year association with the club. He had two spells as caretaker manager during this time. He was given a testimonial match by the club in November 2001 against Manchester United, which Barnsley won 1–0.

Winstanley became technical director of the Saint Kitts and Nevis national team in 2001, before leaving in February 2004. He worked as youth-team coach at Doncaster Rovers during the 2004–05 season. Winstanley was brought into the Scarborough coaching staff as assistant manager in October 2005. He left the position in July 2006 following Mark Patterson's arrival onto the coaching staff and became the York City head of youth development in October. He worked in this role along with being Colin Walker's assistant since November 2007 until being appointed head coach following Neil Redfearn's arrival as youth-team coach in February 2008. He was dismissed as head coach alongside manager Walker on 21 November 2008.

He joined South African team SuperSport United as technical director of the club's development wing in October 2009.

Death
Winstanley died on 20 May 2021 aged 76.

Career statistics

Managerial statistics

Honours
Individual
Barnsley Player of the Season: 1972–73

References

1944 births
2021 deaths
Footballers from Barnsley
English footballers
England youth international footballers
Association football defenders
Barnsley F.C. players
Chesterfield F.C. players
English Football League players
English football managers
Barnsley F.C. managers
English Football League managers
Association football coaches
Barnsley F.C. non-playing staff
Doncaster Rovers F.C. non-playing staff
Scarborough F.C. non-playing staff
York City F.C. non-playing staff